The Moscow State Academy of Choreography, commonly known as The Bolshoi Ballet Academy, is one of the oldest and most prestigious schools of ballet in the world, located in Moscow, Russia. It is the affiliate school of the Bolshoi Ballet.

The Bolshoi Ballet receives the majority of its dancers from the academy, as do most other Moscow ballet companies. Numerous choreographers, instructors and graduates of the academy have become renowned, including Olga Lepeshinskaya, Raisa Struchkova, Natalia Bessmertnova, Ekaterina Maximova,  Maya Plisetskaya, Nikolai Fadeyechev, Vladimir Vasiliev, Mikhail Lavrovsky, Nikolay Tsiskaridze, to be bestowed a People's Artist of the USSR, "prima ballerina assoluta" and "premier dancer", the ultimate title for a ballet performer of the Soviet Union.

The academy was awarded the Japanese Foreign Minister’s Commendation for their contributions to promotion of cultural exchange through art between Japan and Russia on December 1, 2020.

History
Bolshoi is the oldest theatrical school in Moscow, founded as an orphanage by order of Catherine II in 1763. It wasn't until 1773 that the first dance classes were taught at the home. Other names the school is known by are: The Bolshoi Academy, The Bolshoi Ballet School, The Moscow Choreographic Institute, The Moscow Ballet School, The Bolshoi Moscow Ballet School and The Bolshoi Theatre Ballet School.

Heads:

 1773—1777 — Filippo Beccari
 1778—1783 — Leopold Paradise
 1783—1805 — Cosimo Morelli (choreographer)
 1806—1808 — Jean Lamiral
 1808—1811 — Dominique Lefèvre
 1811—1839 — Adam Glushkovskiy
 1839—1846 — Konstantin Bordanov (ru: Богданов, Константин Федорович)
 1846—1850 — Feodor Manokhin (ru: Манохин, Фёдор Николаевич)
 1851—1857 — ?
 1858—1869 — Feodor Manokhin (ru: Манохин, Фёдор Николаевич)
 1869—1872 — Pierre Frédéric Malavergne
 1872—1874 — Gustave Legat
 1874—1883 — Sergey Petrovich Sokolov (ru: Соколов, Сергей Петрович)
 1883—1898 — Aleksey Bogdanov (ru: Богданов, Алексей Николаевич)
 1898—1902 — Vasiliy Geltser (ru: Гельцер, Василий Федорович)
 1902—1907 — Alexander Alexeyevich Gorsky
 1907—1917 — Vasily Tikhomirov (ru: Тихомиров, Василий Дмитриевич)
 1917—1924 — Alexander Alexeyevich Gorsky
 1924 — 1931 — ?
 1931—1936 — Viktor Aleksandrovich Semeonov (ru: Семёнов, Виктор Александрович)
 1937—1941 — Pyotr Gusev
 1942—1945 — Nikolay Ivanovich Tarasov (ru: Тарасов, Николай Иванович)
 1945—1947 — Rostislav Zakharov
 1948—1953 — Leonid Lavrovsky
 1953—1954 — Nikolay Ivanovich Tarasov
 1954—1958 — Michail Gabovich (ru: Габович, Михаил Маркович)
 1959—1964 — Yuriy Kondratov (ru: Кондратов, Юрий Григорьевич)
 1960—2001 — Sofia Golovkina (ru: Головкина, Софья Николаевна)
 1964—1967 — Leonid Lavrovsky
 1968—1972 — Aleksey Yermolayev
 1973—1987 — Maksim Martirosian (ru: Мартиросян, Максим Саакович)
 1988—1993 — Igor Uksusnikov (ru: Уксусников, Игорь Валентинович)
 2001—2002 — Boris Akimov (ru: Акимов, Борис Борисович)
 2002 — Marina Leonova (ru: Леонова, Марина Константиновна)

Method and education
The  Bolshoi's method of teaching is founded on a classical training curriculum that is coordinated to the students' ability. The curriculum includes ballet technique, pointe work, centre work, repertoire, pas de deux, jazz, character dance and historical dance.

Facilities
Amenities at the Bolshoi Ballet Academy include twenty large studios with a professional non-slip dance floor. High ceilings make it possible to offer pas de deux classes, and two levels of ballet barres are provided for young children and adults.

Alumni

The Bolshoi is the school from which the Bolshoi Ballet gets the majority of its dancers, as well as most other Moscow ballet companies. The academy has graduated a long list of acclaimed ballerinas and danseurs, including:

Maria Alexandrova
Alexander Andrianov
Nina Ananiashvili
Dmitry Belogolovtsev
Natalia Bessmertnova
Margarita Drozdova
Nikolai Fadeyechev
Sergei Filin
Yekaterina Geltzer
Nadezhda Gracheva 
Dmitry Gudanov
Nina Kaptsova
Maria Kochetkova
Marina Kondratyeva
Ekaterina Krysanova
Mikhail Lavronsky
Olga Lepeshinskaya
Ilze Liepa
Andris Liepa
Maris Liepa
Svetlana Lunkina
Vladimir Malakhov
Xenia Makletzova
Ekaterina Maximova
Elina Melnichenko
Asaf Messerer
Alla Mikhalchenko
Igor Moiseyev
Mikhail Mordkin
Irek Mukhamedov
Anastasia Nabokina
Kazuha Nakamura
Natalia Osipova
Maya Plisetskaya
Alexander Plisetski
Polina Semionova
Ruslan Skvortsov
Nina Sorokina
Galina Stepanenko
Raisa Struchkova
Vasily Tikhomirov
Nikolai Tsiskaridze
Vladimir Vasiliev
Andrey Uvarov

Summer intensive
The academy partners with the Russian American Foundation to hold annual summer intensives at Lincoln Center in New York City and in Middlebury, CT.

References

External links
Official website 
The Moscow State Academy of Choreography page at UNESCO
Summer Intensive in New York City

Education in Moscow
 
Education in the Soviet Union
Ballet schools in Russia
1773 establishments in the Russian Empire
Choreography